Glory Iroka (born 3 January 1990) is a Nigerian international footballer who plays as a midfielder for Nigerian Women's Championship club Rivers Angels and the Nigeria women's national football team.

International career 
She was part of the Nigeria national team in the African Women's Championship of 2012 and 2014, winning the latter.

Honours

International
 Nigeria
 African Women's Championship (2): 2014

References

External links
 
 

1990 births
Living people
Nigeria women's international footballers
Women's association football midfielders
2011 FIFA Women's World Cup players
Nigerian women's footballers
Rivers Angels F.C. players